Pakistan Air Force Base Faisal, founded as RAF Drigh Road, now called Shahrah-e-Faisal. This air force base is located at Karachi, Sindh, Pakistan. In 1975, it was named after the late King Faisal of Saudi Arabia. 

It is the site of PAF's Southern Air Command HQ and PAF Air War College.

History
During the British Raj, PAF Base Faisal was established in 1933 and was known as RAF Drigh Road. It was the first air force station in the Indian subcontinent and was the birthplace of the colonial-era Royal Indian Air Force, the PAF's parent force. The Royal Air Force mutiny of 1946 was a mutiny on dozens of Royal Air Force stations in the Indian Subcontinent in January 1946. The mutiny began at RAF Drigh Road, now known as PAF Base Faisal, and later spread to involve nearly 50,000 men over 60 RAF stations in British India and RAF bases as far as Singapore.

PAF Base Masroor is the other Pakistan Air Force base in Karachi. The new PAF Base Bholari near Karachi was inaugurated in January 2018.

Recent developments
It is currently the home of the PAF Air War College, preparing Pakistan Air Force junior officers who have already been marked for promotion for command and staff duties at the operational level. One of the facilities at PAF Base Faisal, the 102 Air Engineering depot, is responsible for the overhaul of turbojet engines for the PAF's fleet of Chengdu F-7. The F-7 is a type of Chinese interceptor aircraft. On 4 July 2003 a ceremony was held to celebrate the roll-out of the 10,000th turbojet engine to be overhauled at the facility. 

The engine overhaul workshop was also upgraded to overhaul the newer WP-13F turbojet engines of the PAF's latest F-7 model, the F-7PG.

See also
 List of Pakistan Air Force bases
 List of airports in Pakistan
 Pakistan Air Force
 PAF Base Masroor
 PNS Mehran

References
 

Airports in Karachi
Military installations in Karachi
Pakistan Air Force bases
World War II sites in India